Suddia is a genus of plants in the grass family. The only known species is Suddia sagittifolia, which is native to South Sudan in central Africa.

References

Oryzoideae
Monotypic Poaceae genera
Endemic flora of South Sudan